José Antonio Racchumick Torres (born 1 January 2002) is a Peruvian footballer who plays as a centre-back for Club Sportivo Cienciano.

Career statistics

Club

Notes

References

2002 births
Living people
People from Talara
Peruvian footballers
Peru youth international footballers
Association football defenders
Peruvian Primera División players
Peruvian Segunda División players
Sporting Cristal footballers
Sport Boys footballers
Cienciano footballers